William James Buchanon (born April 5, 1983) is a former American football wide receiver who played one season with the Oakland Raiders of the National Football League. He was signed by the Oakland Raiders as an undrafted free agent in 2006. He played college football at Southern California.  Buchanon has also been a member of the New York Giants, Kansas City Chiefs and Carolina Panthers. He is the son of former NFL cornerback Willie Buchanon.

Early years
Buchanon attended Oceanside High School.

College career
Buchanon played college football at the University of Southern California.

Professional career

First stint with Raiders
Buchanon signed to the Oakland Raiders as an undrafted free agent. Despite a great showing in the 2006 Hall of Fame Game win against the Philadelphia Eagles, he did not make the team's final 53-man roster, but he was signed to the practice squad.

After the Raiders were hit with a string of injuries late in the year, resulting in several players being placed on the injured reserve, Buchanon was activated from the practice squad on December 20, 2006, and signed to the 53-man roster. For the last few games of the regular season, he was even on the 40-man roster active for the games. He saw very limited playing time, but still made one catch for nine yards in a losing contest against the Kansas City Chiefs in Week 16.

On August 16, 2007 the Raiders released him.

New York Giants
On August 21, 2007 the Giants picked him off waivers and released him six days later.

Kansas City Chiefs
On September 20, 2007, he was picked up by the Chiefs and put on their Practice squad.

Second stint with Raiders
In the 2008 offseason, Buchanon re-signed with the Raiders. However, he was waived by the team on July 23.

Carolina Panthers
On July 28, 2008, Buchanon was signed by the Carolina Panthers. He was released by the team during final cuts on August 30, but re-signed to the practice squad a day later. He was released from the practice squad on December 16.

References

External links
Carolina Panthers bio
Oakland Raiders bio
USC Trojans bio
Will Buchanon on CBS's NFL

1983 births
Living people
Sportspeople from Oceanside, California
American football wide receivers
USC Trojans football players
Oakland Raiders players
New York Giants players
Kansas City Chiefs players
Carolina Panthers players